Grębków  is a village in Węgrów County, Masovian Voivodeship, in east-central Poland. It is the seat of the gmina (administrative district) called Gmina Grębków.

The village has a population has a population of 433.

References

External links
 Jewish Community in Grębków on Virtual Shtetl

Villages in Węgrów County